The following is a historical list of television and radio networks and announcers who have broadcast NASCAR events.

2020s

2010s

2000s

1990s

1980s

1970s

1960s

See also
List of Daytona 500 broadcasters
List of NASCAR All-Star Race broadcasters
List of Formula One broadcasters

References

External links

Awful Announcing
NASCAR on ABC
ESPN
NASCAR on Fox
FS1
NASCAR on NBC
NBCSN
NASCAR on TNT
NASCAR ratings
Daytona 500 Ratings: Danica Lifts Overnights to Seven-Year High Daytona 500 Ratings: Danica Lifts Overnights to Seven-Year High
NASCAR 'Daytona 500' TV Ratings History + Your Guess For This Year (Poll)
NASCAR All-Star Race - NASCAR Cup Series
All-Star Race | Official Site Of NASCAR - NASCAR.com
NASCAR on Fox website
NASCAR on NBC website
The Daly Planet (Website breaks down TV and Media coverage)
NASCAR on ESPN Media Guide

CBS Sports
NBC Sports
NBCSN
ESPN announcers
ABC Sports
Turner Sports
Speed (TV network)
Fox Sports announcers
 
 
USA Network Sports